The Beachbody Company is a publicly traded American fitness and media company based in El Segundo, California. It operates the brands Beachbody On Demand, Team Beachbody, MYXfitness and Openfit. The company also sells dietary supplements such as Shakeology and Beachbar through direct response infomercials and multi-level marketing via independent Team Beachbody "coaches" who serve as sales consultants.

History

The company was founded in 1998 by Carl Daikeler and Jon Congdon in Santa Monica, California. Daikeler was previously in informercials for Lifeline Gym and :08 Min Abs in the 1990s. The founders received $500,000 in angel investing, developed a series of workout videos and bought the website Beachbody.com.

In 2005, P90X, or Power 90 Extreme, was created by Tony Horton as a commercial home exercise regimen and developed as a successor to the program called "Power 90". It consists of a training program that uses cross-training and periodization, combined with a nutrition and dietary supplement plan. It was heavily marketed through infomercials and celebrity endorsements.

In 2007, customers began selling workout DVDs. The company announced that it was developing an OTT streaming platform in 2015 that would function similar to Netflix containing all of its exercise workouts previously available on DVD. The platform gained popularity early in the COVID-19 pandemic with more than half a million new subscribers at that time.

Between June and November 2017, advertising watchdog organization Truth in Advertising found that Beachbody distributors were making false and unsubstantiated income claims to promote the company's business opportunity. The FTC has stated that 99.6% of all MLM participants will lose money, after factoring in the costs to join.

In 2017, Beachbody agreed to pay $3.6 million to settle a lawsuit from the city of Santa Monica over automatic credit card renewals. It was alleged that Beachbody was charging its customers’ credit cards on an automatic, recurring basis without the required written consent of those customers.

A three-way merger between Forest Road Acquisition Corp, Myx Fitness Holdings and Beachbody was entered into in February 2021, which valued the new business combination at $2.9 billion.

Divisions

Beachbody On Demand

The company introduced a video on demand streaming subscription service known as Beachbody On Demand in 2015 with a library of at-home workouts from programs such as Insanity and P90X. According to the CEO, the company's board was hesitant to offer all of its workout DVDs for a single subscription rate.

Its programs include Morning Meltdown 100, 80 Day Obsession, LIIFT4, 21 Day Fix and Insanity.

Due to lockdowns associated with the COVID-19 pandemic, Beachbody On Demand experienced growth of more than 300 percent in new subscribers, passing 2 million overall by April 2020. The company announced that it would stream free classes for children on Vimeo during the pandemic.

Team Beachbody
Team Beachbody encourages members of the general public to enroll as "coaches". These customers-turned-salespeople register online as a "coach" and sell fitness packages using Beachbody products and programs including workout DVDs, food supplements and meal plans and in turn earning up to 25% commission for each sale. Carl Daikeler, a co-founder described coaches as serving as "walking billboards and salespeople who want to help their family and friends..." and that the "average lifespan" of a coach is three months. In 2013, CNN reported that within two years of Team Beachbody's launch, sales of the parent company's products rose more than 60%.

In 2015, news outlets claimed the division was a "scheme" as anyone could register as a coach.

It was later reported that Team Beachbody coaches earned an average of $2,600 per year and more than half of its coaches earned nothing.

Shakeology is a dietary supplement that is sold by Team Beachbody. It was formulated by Darin Olien, who also co-created the company's plant-based Ultimate Reset 21-day detox programme.

MYXfitness
The Beachbody Company acquired MYXfitness, an exercise bike manufacturer, upon going public in June 2021. MYX remained in Greenwich, Connecticut and released an updated indoor cycle that July. It integrated Beachbody On Demand and Openfit within an existing library of workout content.

Openfit
In 2018, Congdon co-founded a personalized nutrition programming and tracking app with "FaceTime for fitness" live group classes called Openfit. The company acquired LeBron James and Arnold Schwarzenegger's Ladder, which develops nutritional products to help athletes with severe cramping after James had issues in the 2014 NBA Finals. The terms of the deal were not disclosed, James and Schwarzenegger remained minority stakeholders.

References

External links
 

Health clubs in the United States
Companies based in Santa Monica, California
Health care companies established in 1998
Retail companies established in 1998
1998 establishments in California
Medical and health organizations based in California
Infomercials
Special-purpose acquisition companies